The Colonial Times was a newspaper in what is now the Australian state of Tasmania. It was established as the Colonial Times, and Tasmanian Advertiser in 1825 in Hobart, Van Diemen's Land by the former editor of the Hobart Town Gazette, and Van Diemen's Land Advertiser, Andrew Bent.  The name was changed to Colonial Times in 1828. In 1857 the title was absorbed into the Hobart Town Mercury.

Notes

References

Further reading
Kirkpatrick, Rod (2006), Select chronology of significant Australian press events from 1802-1850
Kirkpatrick, Rod (2006), Select chronology of significant Australian press events from 1851-1900
Pretyman, E.R. (1966) Bent, Andrew (1790-1851) in the Australian Dictionary of Biography (Online)
History of the Mercury from the Mercury Print Museum.

External links
 

Publications established in 1825
Defunct newspapers published in Tasmania
1825 establishments in Australia
Newspapers in Hobart, Tasmania
Weekly newspapers published in Australia